Rostadneset is a village in the municipality of Fredrikstad, Norway, north of the city of Fredrikstad in the former municipality Rolvsøy. Its population (SSB 2005) is 277.

References 

Villages in Østfold